The 2015 AFL Grand Final was an Australian rules football match contested between the Hawthorn Football Club and the West Coast Eagles at the Melbourne Cricket Ground on 3 October 2015. It was the 120th annual Grand Final of the Australian Football League (formerly the Victorian Football League), staged to determine the premiers for the 2015 AFL season. The match, attended by 98,632 spectators, was won by Hawthorn by a margin of 46 points, marking the club's third consecutive premiership and thirteenth VFL/AFL premiership victory overall. Hawthorn's Cyril Rioli was awarded the Norm Smith Medal as the best player on the ground.

Background

With the Fremantle Dockers and West Coast Eagles finishing first and second respectively on the AFL ladder at the conclusion of the home and away season (and both subsequently winning their qualifying finals to set up two home preliminary finals in Perth for the first time), it was widely anticipated during much of the latter part of the season that the 2015 Grand Final would be contested as a western derby between the two Western Australian teams for the first time at the MCG.

 experienced an average start to the year, with a record of 4–4 after eight matches (including losses to non-finals teams ,  and ), but would lose just twice more for the remainder of the regular season to finish in the top three for the fifth consecutive year.

West Coast entered the season low on expectations after finishing ninth the previous year and losing key defenders Eric Mackenzie and Mitch Brown to knee injuries early on. Losing two of their first three games, to the Western Bulldogs and Fremantle, the Eagles finished the season with a record of 16–5–1 to finish in the top two for the first time since 2006.  The Eagles received the week off after beating Hawthorn in the Qualifying Final by 32 points, and subsequently defeated  by 25 points in the Preliminary Final to progress to their first Grand Final since 2006.

Hawthorn and West Coast also met once during the home-and-away season, in round 19, also at West Coast's home ground Domain Stadium, with Hawthorn winning by 14 points.

The Grand Final was held on the first Saturday in October, rather than its traditional date on the last Saturday of September, because the 2015 Cricket World Cup delayed access to some AFL grounds early in the season. The game was held at the Melbourne Cricket Ground (MCG), as is traditional. The MCG serves as Hawthorn's main home ground for the home and away season, and media commentators suggested that Hawthorn would have an advantage playing there over West Coast who had only played there once during the season compared to Hawthorn's 11 matches. It was the second time that the two sides had met in a Grand Final; the first was in 1991, a contest which Hawthorn won by a margin of 53 points.

The 2015 AFL Grand Final was the last AFL match to utilise substitutions until the 2021 season; the AFL reverting to a four-man interchange bench from the 2016 AFL season onwards. The last AFL substitution occurred in the 27 minute mark of the match's 3rd quarter, with Matt Suckling replacing David Hale.

Media coverage
The match was televised by the Seven Network. The match commentary was conducted by Bruce McAvaney and Dennis Cometti for the Seven Network, marking the duo's seventh grand final appearance together as commentators since 2008 and their eleventh overall. Individually, it was Cometti's seventeenth grand final and McAvaney's fifteenth.

The match was shown on Seven's main channel and also their high-definition channel, 7mate. A total of 2,640,000 people across the two channels watched the match, making the Grand Final the most viewed television broadcast of the day.

Pre-match entertainment

Similar to previous grand finals, the 2015 AFL Grand Final provided both pre-match and post-match entertainment. On 7 September 2015, it was announced that English singer Ellie Goulding, Canadian musician Bryan Adams and American musician Chris Isaak would be performing on the day. On 17 September 2015, the league announced that Australian singer Kate Ceberano would perform the national anthem, while musician Mike Brady would perform his famous football song, "Up There Cazaly".

For the first time, the day before the Grand Final was declared a public holiday in Victoria by the incoming Daniel Andrews government, as promised during the campaigning for the 2014 Victorian state election.  As this would reduce the number of workers in the Melbourne City Centre, the traditional route for the Grand Final Parade was changed to leave from the Old Treasury Building and finish at Yarra Park, adjacent to the Melbourne Cricket Ground. A record crowd of 150,000 people turned up to watch the parade.

Match summary

The game was played on a very hot day, with the temperature reaching 31.3 degrees Celsius at 3:28 pm. This broke the previous record high for a Grand Final of 30.7 degrees Celsius recorded at the 1987 VFL Grand Final. Prior to the game it was widely thought that the conditions would favour West Coast after Hawthorn had played a tough finals campaign of three successive finals, including travelling to Perth twice, without having a week off. The Eagles, being based in Perth, were also generally more used to playing in warmer conditions than Hawthorn.

First quarter

Luke Shuey kicked the first goal two minutes into the game from a free kick awarded against Jordan Lewis. Hawthorn's Cyril Rioli responded only 90 seconds later and the Hawks kicked the next four goals of the quarter, with Ben McEvoy, Rioli, Grant Birchall and Bradley Hill each kicking majors. Meanwhile, the Eagles wasted opportunities, with Shuey ignoring a handball to an open Jamie Cripps in front of goal in preference to a dribbled kick that missed. West Coast's Jack Darling also missed a goal at the thirteen-minute mark. At the first change the Hawks led by 19 points.

Second quarter
The Hawks completely dominated the first half of the second quarter. Hawthorn captain Luke Hodge kicked the first goal in the first minute of the term with a remarkable checkside kick from hard against the boundary line in the forward pocket. The Eagles continued to waste opportunities, with captain Shannon Hurn hitting the post from directly in front of goals to make the scoreline 1.6 to 6.1 at the six-minute mark. This was followed by a burst of three goals from the Hawks in quick succession, with Jack Gunston kicking two and Isaac Smith one, resulting in Hawthorn taking a stranglehold on the game.

After trailing by 44 points at the 14-minute mark of the term, Sam Butler and Matt Priddis missed shots at goal, but West Coast briefly threatened to get back into the game when Josh Hill and Elliot Yeo kicked the final two goals of the quarter, the latter from a set shot after the siren. The Hawks enjoyed a 31-point lead at half time.

Third quarter
The two teams traded goals in the first half of the quarter as the Eagles made a challenge to get back into the game. Darling kicked the first goal of the third quarter for the Eagles, but then the Eagles squandered 2 golden opportunities for goals inside 50 to close the margin further. Shuey turned the ball over by foot when he had a simple handball option available before Darling dropped a simple chest mark that would’ve given him another set shot on goal. The Hawks then made the Eagles pay through the agency of Ryan Schoenmakers. Three minutes later Mark Hutchings kicked truly for the Eagles to again close the margin and give the Eagles some hope. However this proved to be a false dawn as the Hawks then effectively killed the contest by kicking four unanswered goals through Gunston (two goals), Smith and substitute Matt Suckling, to take a commanding 50-point break into the final period.

Final quarter
Hawthorn began the last quarter where they left off in the third, with a goal to Jarryd Roughead just two minutes in and another to Smith two minutes later. In a moment that was said to epitomise Hawthorn's attitude on the day, full-back Brian Lake made a diving smother to prevent a certain Josh Hill goal for the Eagles, despite the game being effectively over. The next fifteen minutes of the term were goalless before the Eagles restored some respectability to the scoreline with the final three goals of the game (one to Mark LeCras and two to Jeremy McGovern).

Overall report

Hawthorn clearly beat the opposition across the ground, with 19 more inside 50s, 16 more contested possessions, 115 more disposals and 14 more tackles. The Eagles were largely tentative and paid for poor ball use, frequently making skill errors and turning the ball over. Hawthorn's goalkicking was also accurate when it mattered - early in the final quarter they had scored 16.5, but added a further six behinds after that.

Amongst the best for Hawthorn were Rioli (18 disposals, 12 marks, two goals and four goal assists), Sam Mitchell (34 touches, six clearances), James Frawley (22 disposals, 11 marks and kept Eagles forward Josh Kennedy goalless), Hodge (30 disposals, 8 marks), Smith (three goals and 23 disposals), Shaun Burgoyne (26 disposals), Josh Gibson (29 disposals and 8 marks) and Gunston (four goals). Andrew Gaff was the best for the Eagles with 34 disposals.

The Hawks became only the fifth club and sixth team in VFL/AFL history to win a hat-trick of premierships, and the first to do so since the Brisbane Lions in 2001, 2002 and 2003 Grand Finals. Seven Hawks players became four-time premiership winners: Rioli, Lewis, Mitchell, Roughead, Birchall and Hodge all with Hawthorn, and Burgoyne adding a third Hawthorn premiership medallion to his premiership won with Port Adelaide in 2004. Alastair Clarkson also won his fourth premiership as coach of Hawthorn, making him the 12th four-time VFL/AFL premiership coach.
As of 2022, this is Hawthorn's last finals victory.

Norm Smith Medal

Cyril Rioli was named the Norm Smith Medallist (best on ground). Rioli polled 13 votes out of a possible 15, beating his teammate Sam Mitchell who had nine votes. Rioli emulated his uncles Maurice Rioli—who won the medal for Richmond in 1982 in their loss to Carlton—and Essendon's Michael Long, who was awarded the medal in their win over Carlton in 1993.

Chaired by Peter Bell, the voters and their choices were as follows:

Teams
The teams were announced on 1 October 2015. Hawthorn made one change to its lineup from the previous week's preliminary final, with Jack Gunston returning from an ankle injury and Billy Hartung omitted. West Coast named an unchanged team from its preliminary final. Matt Rosa was the substitute for West Coast and Matt Suckling filled that role for Hawthorn.

Umpires
The umpiring panel, comprising three field umpires, four boundary umpires, two goal umpires and an emergency in each position is given below. The most notable appointment was field umpire Jeff Dalgleish's selection for his first grand final.

Numbers in brackets represent the number of Grand Finals umpired, including 2015.

Scorecard

Strikes in the lead-up

More than 180 brewery workers at the Carlton & United Breweries (CUB) factory in Abbotsford, Victoria voted to go on strike in the lead up to the 2015 AFL Grand Final. It was feared that this could potentially affect the production of Carlton Draught and Victoria Bitter in the lead up to the game, although the brewery stated that a strike would not cause any loss of production, and that Carlton & United could potentially request supplies from its other factories during a strike if production was lost.

Also affecting Melbourne in late 2015 was a series of transport strikes. Strikes by tram and train drivers against Yarra Trams and Metro Trains Melbourne during finals were threatened, with CFMEU Secretary John Setka declaring that the finals were a "wonderful time to have some industrial action".

References

Grand Final
AFL Grand Final
VFL/AFL Grand Finals
Hawthorn Football Club
West Coast Eagles